The 1907 Arkansas Razorbacks football team represented the University of Arkansas during the 1907 college football season. In their second and final season under head coach Frank Longman, the Razorbacks compiled a 4–4–1 record and were outscored by their opponents by a combined total of 110 to 73.  Although team lore indicates that the program adopted the "Razorbacks" nickname in 1910, the nickname was already in use during the 1907 season.

Schedule

References

Arkansas
Arkansas Razorbacks football seasons
Arkansas Razorbacks football